Albert Edward Harbot (1896-1968), was a male badminton player from England.

Badminton career
Harbot born in Leicester was a winner of the All England Open Badminton Championships. He won the mixed doubles in 1928 with Margaret Tragett.

He gained his England caps while playing for Hampshire.

References

English male badminton players
1896 births
1968 deaths